Peter Trosdal Way (August 15, 1937 – October 6, 2018) was an American clergyman and politician who served in the Virginia House of Delegates.

References

External links
 
 

1937 births
2018 deaths
Virginia Republicans
20th-century American politicians